Uganda  has a long and, until relatively recently, quite permissive LGBT history. During precolonial times, the “mudoko dako,” or effeminate males among the Langi of northern Uganda were treated as women and could marry men. Religious roles for cross-dressing men (homosexual priests) were historically found among the Bunyoro people. The Teso people also acknowledged a category of men who dressed as women. However, a man dressing as a woman has nothing to do with his sexual orientation and vice versa  

It is alleged that Kabaka Mwanga II, who ruled in the latter half of the 19th century, was bisexual. However  there is no historical documentation of this. Homosexuality in Uganda was criminalized in 1902. 

In February 2014, president Yoweri Museveni signed a new law, the Uganda Anti-Homosexuality Act, which provided for tougher penalties for gay people including criminalizing people who did not report them. The new law also covered lesbians for the first time. However, on 1 August 2014, the Constitutional Court of Uganda ruled the new law invalid.

References

History of Uganda
Uganda
History